Jonah 2 is the second chapter of the Book of Jonah in the Hebrew Bible or the Old Testament of the Christian Bible. This book contains the prophecies attributed to the prophet Jonah, and is a part of the Book of the Twelve Minor Prophets.

Text 
The original text was written in Hebrew language. This chapter is divided into 10 verses in Christian Bibles, but 11 verses in the Hebrew Bible with the following verse numbering comparison:

This article generally follows the common numbering in Christian English Bible versions, with notes to the numbering in Hebrew Bible versions.

Textual versions

Some early manuscripts containing the text of this chapter in Hebrew are of the Masoretic Text tradition, which includes the Codex Cairensis (895), the Petersburg Codex of the Prophets (916), and Codex Leningradensis (1008). Fragments cumulatively containing all verses of this chapter in Hebrew were found among the Dead Sea Scrolls, including 4Q76 (4QXIIa; 150–125 BCE) with extant verse 6 (verses 2:1,7 in Masoretic Text); 4Q82 (4QXIIg; 25 BCE) with extant verses 2–10 (verses 3–11 in Masoretic Text); and Wadi Murabba'at Minor Prophets (Mur88; MurXIIProph; 75–100 CE) with extant verses 1–10 (verses 1–11 in Masoretic Text).

There is also a translation into Koine Greek known as the Septuagint, made in the last few centuries BCE. Extant ancient manuscripts of the Septuagint version include Codex Vaticanus (B; B; 4th century), Codex Sinaiticus (S; BHK: S; 4th century), Codex Alexandrinus (A; A; 5th century) and Codex Marchalianus (Q; Q; 6th century). Fragments containing parts of this chapter in Greek were found among the Dead Sea Scrolls, that is, Naḥal Ḥever 8Ḥev1 (8ḤevXIIgr); late 1st century BCE) with extant verses 1–6 (verses 1–7 in Masoretic Text).

Verse 1
 Then Jonah prayed unto the Lord his God out of the fish's belly,
 Verse numbering: Masoretic texts number this verse as Jonah 2:2.
 "Then" ("And"): that is, after 3 days and 3 nights. 
 "Jonah prayed": The grammatical arrangement, and especially the language of verse 7, seem to speak of a deliverance "already experienced" rather than "expected"; it is rather a "thanksgiving" than a "prayer" - like that of Hanna's.
 "His God": He acknowledges Jehovah as his God, first by inspiration, by chastisement, and finally by mercy.
Jonah had sinned against the Lord, and had been sorely chastised by him, yet he did not take his lovingkindness from him. Covenant interest and relation still continued and Jonah had knowledge as well as faith in it; and as this is an argument the Lord makes use of to engage backsliders to return unto him, it is a great encouragement to them so to do (cf. ). In this Jonah was a type of Christ, who, amidst his agonies, sorrows, and sufferings, prayed to his Father, and claimed his interest in him as his God (cf. ).

Verse 10
 And the Lord spake unto the fish, and it vomited out Jonah upon the dry land.
 Verse numbering: Masoretic texts number this verse as Jonah 2:11.
 "upon the dry land": not upon the shore of the Red sea, as some; much less upon the shore of Nineveh, which was not built upon the seashore, but upon the river Tigris; and the fish must have carried him all round Africa, and part of Asia, to have brought him to the banks of the Tigris; which could not have been done in three days' time, nor in much greater. Josephus says it was upon the shore of the Euxine sea; but the nearest part of it to Nineveh was one thousand six hundred miles from Tarsus, which the whale, very slow in swimming, cannot be thought to go in three days; besides, no very large fish swim in the Euxine sea, because of the straits of the Propontis, through which they cannot pass, as Bochart from various writers has proved. It is more likely, as others, that it was on the Syrian shore, or in the bay of Issus, now called the gulf of Lajazzo; or near Alexandria, or Alexandretta, now Scanderoon. But it could also be on the shore of Palestine, near the place from whence they sailed. Huetius and others think it probable that this case of Jonah gave rise to the story of Arion, who was cast into the sea by the mariners, took up by a dolphin, and carried to Corinth. Jonah's deliverance was a type of our Lord's resurrection from the dead on the third day, ; and a pledge of ours; for, after this instance of divine power, why should it be thought a thing incredible that God should raise the dead?

See also
 Jonah
Related Bible parts: Jonah 1

Notes

References

Sources

External links

Jewish
Jonah 2 Hebrew with Parallel English
Jonah 2 Hebrew with Rashi's Commentary

Christian
Jonah 2 English Translation with Parallel Latin Vulgate

02